Justice Muhammad Nawaz Bhatti (August 1948– 10 July 2006) who hailed from Sangla Hill area of Sheikhupura district was a Pakistani judge and lawyer. He was a judge of Lahore High Court, Lahore, (Punjab) Pakistan and a well known criminal lawyer and law officer representing the governments of Punjab and Pakistan.

He was appointed as an Additional Advocate General Punjab in 1998–1999 earlier he also served as an Assistant Advocate General Punjab twice in 1993 and 1997. He was appointed as Deputy Attorney General of Pakistan from 2000 to 2004, when he was sworn in as a judge of the Lahore High Court in Multan on January 12, 2004.

He died in a plane crash near Multan Airport on 10 July 2006, while he was serving as judge. The plane burst into flames shortly after takeoff and landed in a wheat field three kilometres from the airport. His funeral was attended by hundreds including his fellow judges. He was buried in Sangla Hill. His son Amir Nawaz Bhatti is also a practicing lawyer and member of Lahore High Court Bar Association, Lahore.

References

1948 births
2006 deaths
Pakistani judges
Lawyers from Lahore
Victims of aviation accidents or incidents in Pakistan
Victims of aviation accidents or incidents in 2006